The Pampanga Dragons were a professional basketball team of the now-defunct Metropolitan Basketball Association from 1998 to 2000 and in 2002 as Pampanga Stars. The team was owned by Jose Antonio Gonzales II and was named Dragons because the father and son pair of Tony and Anton Gonzales owned Mondragon Industries.

History
The Pampanga Dragons took early leadership during the infant stage of the Metropolitan league, winning their first four games with Ato Agustin, a one-time PBA Most Valuable Player, averaging 25.2 points per game in their four straight victories before a sprain ankle kept him out in the Dragons' 73-78 loss to Manila Metrostars prior to the Holy Week break for their first loss in five games.

First league champion
The Pampanga Dragons were the first MBA national champions in the inaugural season in 1998, the Dragons defeated the Negros Slashers, four games to one, in the national finals. Ato Agustin's two charities with only three seconds to go, sealed an 89-85 victory in Game five.  Among the rosters in the champion team of coach Aric del Rosario, aside from Agustin, were Gherome Ejercito, Ato Morano, Udoy Belmonte, Andy de Guzman, Norman Gonzales, 6-5 Angelo David and 6-foot-4 bruiser Dave Bautista.

Next two seasons (1999-2000)
Though Pampanga acquired the services of PBA's "Mr. Excitement" Bong Alvarez in 1999 it lost some key players during the off-season: Bryant Punzalan 
(to SocSarGen Marlins), Norman Gonzales (to Cagayan de Oro Amigos), and Gherome Ejercito to new team (San Juan Knights).  The team also lost Ato Agustin as he went back to the PBA playing for Sta. Lucia Realtors. The Dragons fell to hard times during the 2000 MBA season, forcing Dragons owner Anton Gonzales to file a leave of absence beginning the following year.

Return as Pampanga Stars in 2002
They make a comeback in the 2002 MBA season as Pampanga Stars, this time under coach Allan Trinidad

Roster lists
Ariel L. Reyes 
Renato Agustin
Paul Alvarez
Ernesto Ballesteros
Billy Bansil
Dave Bautista
Rudolf Belmonte
Celino Cruz
Gabby Cui
Angelo David
Andy de Guzman
Jonathan de Guzman
Gherome Ejercito
Ariel Garcia
Junel Mendiola
 Rolof Liangco
Renato Morano
Aldrin Morante
Michael Otto
Roland Pascual
Ramon Pido
Bryant Punzalan
Paeng Santos
Vince John Santos
Siot Tanquingcen
Eric Gascon

Team Manager 
Gil Cortez

References

External links
MBA (1998-2002)@gameface.ph

Metropolitan Basketball Association teams
Basketball teams established in 1998
1998 establishments in the Philippines